Rumford is a small village between Maddiston and Brightons in the Falkirk council area, of Scotland.

The village went through a great deal of expansion in the late 1990s and early 2000s, resulting in the population increasing exponentially since the 1991 census, when it was recorded as around 275 residents. In the 2001 and 2011 censuses, Falkirk Council reported the population as being 421 and 884 respectively.

See also
Falkirk Braes villages
List of places in Falkirk council area

References

External links

Canmore - Rumford, Maddiston Road, St Anthony site record

Villages in Falkirk (council area)